Nadine Monfils (born 12 February 1953) is a Belgian writer and film director and producer.

She was born in Etterbeek. She has contributed to the magazines , Tel Quel and Focus. Monfils published her first collection of stories Laura Colombe, Contes pour petites filles perverse in 1981. She has written a series of detective novels centred on the character Inspector Léon, a policeman who knits; Léon also appears in her 2004 film Madame Édouard.

She has taught screenwriting at the Parallax school for comedians and the Université Européenne d’Ecriture in Brussels and also in a number of prisons in France. Monflils lives in Montmartre.

Selected works 
 Un Noël de chien, short film (2000)
 Madame Édouard, film (2004)
 La petite fêlée aux allumettes, novel (2012)
 Les vacances d’un serial killer, novel (2012)
 La Vieille qui voulait tuer le bon dieu, novel (2013)
 Mémé goes to Hollywood, novel (2014)

References

External links 
 
 

1953 births
Belgian film directors
Belgian crime fiction writers
20th-century Belgian dramatists and playwrights
Belgian women film directors
Belgian women film producers
Belgian women dramatists and playwrights
Women crime fiction writers
Belgian journalists
Living people
Belgian women journalists